The Tunisia women's national rugby union team are a national sporting side that represents Tunisia in rugby union. They played their first international test against Senegal on 9 October 2021.

History 
Tunisia played their first test match against Senegal, who were also playing their first test, on 9 October 2021. Tunisia won the match 14–3 at Stade El Menzah in Tunis. They recorded their biggest victory in their 61–0 thrashing of the Ivory Coast in their second test.

Tunisia also competed at the 2022 Rugby Africa Women's Cup.

Record

Overall

Full Internationals

References

African national women's rugby union teams
Rugby union in Tunisia
W